Pękalin  is a settlement in the administrative district of Gmina Mielno, within Koszalin County, West Pomeranian Voivodeship, in north-western Poland.

References

Villages in Koszalin County